Ginés de Pasamonte is a fictional character in Miguel de Cervantes' novel Don Quixote.

Ginés first appears as a criminal freed by Don Quixote in the 22nd chapter of the first part of the novel. After his release, he escapes Don Quixote and the guards. He later reappears as Maese Pedro, a puppeteer who claims that he can talk to his monkey, on the 26th chapter of the second part.

He also stole Sancho's donkey, a part that was omitted from the first edition.

Prior to his release by Don Quixote, Ginés tells him that he is in the process of writing his autobiography. Don Quixote interrogates this writer about his book;

This is the only reference to the popular novel Lazarillo de Tormes in the book, and it acts as a foil for Don Quixote's will to be a literary hero in his own lifetime.

See also
List of Don Quixote characters

References

Don Quixote characters
Fictional criminals
Male characters in literature
Literary characters introduced in 1605
Fictional puppeteers
Fictional writers